Maksym Nikolenko (born 14 August 1993) is a Ukrainian para table tennis player. He won the gold medal in the men's team C6–8 event at the 2016 Summer Paralympics held in Rio de Janeiro, Brazil.

In 2021, he won one of the bronze medals in the men's individual C8 event at the 2020 Summer Paralympics held in Tokyo, Japan. He also won the silver medal in the men's team C8 event.

References

Living people
1993 births
Ukrainian male table tennis players
Paralympic table tennis players of Ukraine
Paralympic gold medalists for Ukraine
Paralympic silver medalists for Ukraine
Paralympic bronze medalists for Ukraine
Paralympic medalists in table tennis
Table tennis players at the 2016 Summer Paralympics
Table tennis players at the 2020 Summer Paralympics
Medalists at the 2016 Summer Paralympics
Medalists at the 2020 Summer Paralympics
Sportspeople from Zaporizhzhia